Aleksandr Aleksandrovich Larin (born 23 June 1983) is a Russian sprinter. He competed in the men's 4 × 400 metres relay at the 2004 Summer Olympics.

References

1983 births
Living people
Athletes (track and field) at the 2004 Summer Olympics
Russian male sprinters
Olympic athletes of Russia
Place of birth missing (living people)
21st-century Russian people